Rojo is an album by jazz pianist Red Garland, released in 1961 on Prestige Records, featuring tracks recorded on August 22, 1958. Oscar Peterson, commenting on the track "Darling, Je Vous Aime Beaucoup" in 1961, criticized Garland's left-hand playing, saying: "I found this very, very monotonous. [...] primarily it's that drone-type left hand, punctuated with chords, that he used invariably".

Track listing 
"Rojo" (Garland) - 8:54
"We Kiss in a Shadow" (Rodgers, Hammerstein II) - 6:47
"Darling Je Vous Aime Beacoup" (Anna Sosenko) - 5:14
"Ralph J. Gleason Blues" (Garland) - 6:43
"You Better Go Now" (Bickley Reichner, Irvin Graham) - 5:11
"Mr. Wonderful" (Weiss, Bock, Holofcener) - 8:14

Personnel 
 Red Garland - piano
 George Joyner - double bass
 Charlie Persip - drums
 Ray Barretto - congas

References 

1961 albums
Albums produced by Bob Weinstock
Prestige Records albums
Red Garland albums
Albums recorded at Van Gelder Studio